Amapa may refer to:

Amapá, one of the states of Brazil
Amapá (municipality), a municipality in that Brazilian state
Amapa, Nayarit, a town in the Mexican state of Nayarit
Amapa morada, common name for the tree Handroanthus impetiginosus, in the family Bignoniaceae, which ranges from northern Mexico to Argentina
Amapa, common name for the tree Parahancornia fasciculata, in the family Apocynaceae, from the Amazon rainforest